Providence County is the most populous county in the U.S. state of Rhode Island. As of the 2020 census, the county's population was 660,741, or 60.2% of the state's population. Providence County contains the city of Providence, the state capital of Rhode Island and the county's (and state's) most populous city, with an estimated 179,335 residents in 2018. Providence County is included in the Providence-Warwick, RI-MA Metropolitan Statistical Area, which in turn constitutes a portion of the greater Boston-Worcester-Providence, MA-RI-NH-CT Combined Statistical Area. As of 2010, the center of population in Rhode Island is located in Providence County, in the city of Cranston.

History
Providence County was constituted on June 22, 1703, as the County of Providence Plantations. It consisted of five towns, namely Providence, Warwick, Westerly, Kingstown, and Greenwich and encompassed territory in present-day Kent and Washington counties. Washington County was split off as King's County in 1729, while Kent County was split off in 1750. The town of Cumberland was acquired from Massachusetts and added to Providence County in 1746–47, and the towns of East Providence and Pawtucket were made part of Providence County when the final border with Massachusetts was settled in 1862.

County government in Rhode Island was abolished in 1842. Providence County, like other counties in Rhode Island, has no governmental functions (other than as court administrative and sheriff corrections boundaries which are part of state government).

Geography
It is the largest of Rhode Island's five counties by land area, but it's the smallest county in the United States that is a state's largest county. The county is drained by the Blackstone River, which runs partly along the east border, the Woonasquatucket River in the central part of the county, joining with the smaller Moshassuck River in downtown Providence, and the Pawtuxet, which forms a portion of the southeastern boundary of the county. The Pawtuxet is dammed in the western part of the county to form the Scituate Reservoir, which supplies drinking water for Providence and surrounding communities.

The highest natural point in the county and the state of Rhode Island is  Jerimoth Hill at 812 feet (247 m). Sea level is the lowest point.

Adjacent counties
 Norfolk County, Massachusetts - northeast
 Bristol County, Massachusetts - east
 Bristol County - southeast
 Kent County - south
 Windham County, Connecticut - west
 Worcester County, Massachusetts - northwest

National protected areas
 Blackstone River Valley National Historical Park (part)
 Roger Williams National Memorial

Major highways

Demographics

2000 census
As of the census of 2000, there were 621,602 people, 239,936 households, and 152,839 families living in the county. The racial makeup of the county was 78.38% White, 6.55% Black or African American, 0.51% Native American, 2.90% Asian, 0.07% Pacific Islander, 8.02% from other races, and 3.58% from two or more races.  13.39% of the population were Hispanic or Latino of any race. 19.0% were of Italian, 10.9% Irish, 8.1% French, 7.7% Portuguese, 7.2% French Canadian and 5.8% English ancestry according to Census 2000. 72.7% spoke English, 13.4% Spanish, 4.9% Portuguese, 2.5% French and 1.6% Italian as their first language.

There were 239,936 households, out of which 30.70% had children under the age of 18 living with them, 44.50% were married couples living together, 14.90% had a female householder with no husband present, and 36.30% were non-families. 29.80% of all households were made up of individuals, and 11.90% had someone living alone who was 65 years of age or older.  The average household size was 2.48 and the average family size was 3.11.

In the county, the population was spread out, with 24.00% under the age of 18, 11.10% from 18 to 24, 29.80% from 25 to 44, 20.50% from 45 to 64, and 14.60% who were 65 years of age or older.  The median age was 35 years. For every 100 females, there were 91.80 males.  For every 100 females age 18 and over, there were 87.90 males.

The median income for a household in the county was $36,950, and the median income for a family was $46,694. Males had a median income of $35,336 versus $26,322 for females. The per capita income for the county was $19,255.  About 11.90% of families and 15.50% of the population were below the poverty line, including 22.30% of those under age 18 and 12.70% of those age 65 or over.

Providence County is 71% Catholic, making it among the most Catholic counties in the country.

2010 census
As of the 2010 United States Census, there were 626,667 people, 241,717 households, and 149,691 families living in the county. The racial makeup of the county was 73.4% white, 8.5% black or African American, 3.7% Asian, 0.7% American Indian, 0.1% Pacific islander, 9.6% from other races, and 4.2% from two or more races. Those of Hispanic or Latino origin made up 18.8% of the population. The largest ancestry groups were:
  18.5% Italian
  15.8% Irish
  12.3% French
  9.4% English
  8.6% Portuguese
  5.4% French Canadian
  5.4% Dominican
  4.9% Puerto Rican
  4.3% Cape Verdean
  4.2% German
  3.8% Polish
  2.9% Guatemalan
  1.7% Scottish
  1.6% American
  1.2% Swedish
  1.2% Colombian
  1.1% Mexican
  1.0% Scotch-Irish
  1.0% Arab

Of the 241,717 households, 31.4% had children under the age of 18 living with them, 40.8% were married couples living together, 15.8% had a female householder with no husband present, 38.1% were non-families, and 30.2% of all households were made up of individuals. The average household size was 2.48 and the average family size was 3.11. The median age was 37.0 years.

The median income for a household in the county was $48,500 and the median income for a family was $61,265. Males had a median income of $44,964 versus $36,447 for females. The per capita income for the county was $25,169. About 11.6% of families and 15.4% of the population were below the poverty line, including 22.1% of those under age 18 and 11.5% of those age 65 or over.

Communities

Cities
 Central Falls
 Cranston
 East Providence
 Pawtucket
 Providence (traditional county seat)
 Woonsocket

Towns

 Burrillville
 Cumberland
 Foster
 Glocester
 Johnston
 Lincoln
 North Providence
 North Smithfield
 Scituate
 Smithfield

Census-designated places

 Chepachet
 Clayville
 Cumberland Hill
 Foster Center
 Greenville
 Harmony
 Harrisville
 Pascoag
 Valley Falls

Other villages

 Albion
 Arnold Mills
 Branch Village
 Esmond
 Forestdale
 Georgiaville
 Glendale
 Lime Rock
 Lonsdale
 Manville
 Oakland
 Primrose
 Quinnville
 Riverside
 Rumford
 Saylesville
 Smithville-North Scituate
 Slatersville
 Union Village
 Waterford

Politics
As an urban county in the heavily liberal region of New England, Providence County is a Democratic stronghold. Richard Nixon is the last Republican presidential candidate to have won the county, doing so in his 1972 landslide. Even then, Nixon only carried it by a very narrow margin.

|}

Education
School districts include

K-12:
 Burrillville School District
 Central Falls School District
 Cranston School District
 Cumberland School District
 East Providence School District
 Johnston School District
 Lincoln School District
 North Providence School District
 North Smithfield School District
 Pawtucket School District
 Providence School District
 Scituate School District
 Smithfield School District
 Woonsocket School District

Secondary:
 Foster-Glocester Regional School District

Elementary:
 Foster Elementary School District
 Glocester Elementary School District

There is a state-operated school: Rhode Island School for the Deaf.

See also

 National Register of Historic Places listings in Providence County, Rhode Island

References

 
1703 establishments in Rhode Island
Populated places established in 1703
Counties in Greater Boston
Providence metropolitan area